NA-153 Multan-VI is a constituency for the National Assembly of Pakistan.

Election 2002 

General elections were held on 10 Oct 2002. Deewan Jaffer Hussain Bukhari of PML-N won by 57,207 votes.

Election 2008 

General elections were held on 18 Feb 2008. Dewan Ashiq Hussain Bukhari of PML-N won by 69,246 votes.

Election 2013 

General elections were held on 11 May 2013. Dewan Ashiq Hussain Bukhari of PML-N won by 94,298 votes and became the  member of National Assembly.

Election 2018

See also
NA-152 Multan-V
NA-154 Lodhran-I

References

External links 
Election result's official website

NA-153